This article contains information about the literary events and publications of 1942.

Events
January 1 – The U.K. Book Production War Economy Agreement comes into force.
February 20 – Jean Bruller's novella Le Silence de la mer (Silence of the Sea), about resistance to the Nazi occupation of France, is issued clandestinely as the first publication of Les Éditions de Minuit in Paris, under the pseudonym "Vercors". A hundred copies are distributed from late summer; the rest are destroyed by the occupying authorities.
February 22 – The Austrian-born novelist Stefan Zweig and his wife Lotte are found dead of a barbiturate overdose in their home in Petrópolis, Brazil, leaving notes indicating despair at the future of European civilization. The manuscript of Zweig's autobiography The World of Yesterday, posted to his publisher a day earlier, is first published in Stockholm later in the year as Die Welt von Gestern.
March – Isaac Asimov's Three Laws of Robotics are introduced in his short story "Runaround", published in Astounding Science-Fiction.
March 1 – The Canadian novelist Robertson Davies begins a 13-year spell as editor of the Peterborough Examiner in Ontario.
March 28 – The Spanish poet Miguel Hernández dies of tuberculosis as a political prisoner in a prison hospital, having scrawled his last verse on the wall.
April 29 – The newspaper Asia Raja is first published in the Dutch East Indies under Japanese occupation; it will publish a number of literary works.
May – The German novelist Thomas Mann moves to California.
May 4 – The French novelist André Gide moves to Tunis.
May 8 – The English novelist David Garnett marries as his second wife, the painter and writer Angelica Bell, daughter of Garnett's lover Duncan Grant and Vanessa Bell.
June 4 – The film Mrs. Miniver is released, for which the novelist James Hilton will share an Academy Award for Best Writing (Adapted Screenplay) on 4 March 1943.
June 12 – Anne Frank, on her 13th birthday, makes the first entry in her new diary in Nazi-occupied Amsterdam.
August – The French Resistance unit to which expatriate Irish writer Samuel Beckett belongs is betrayed. He has to flee from occupied Paris on foot to Roussillon, Vaucluse in south-eastern France, where he continues work on his novel Watt.
August 9 – The New York Times launches the national version of its influential New York Times Best Seller list.
Autumn – Vasily Grossman attends the Battle of Stalingrad as a reporter for the Soviet Army newspaper Krasnaya Zvezda. The experience later governs his novels Stalingrad («Сталингра́д», original Russian publication 1952) and Life and Fate («Жизнь и судьба», completed 1959).
October – The English poet Keith Douglas takes part in the Second Battle of El Alamein, against orders.
November 19 – The Polish Jewish writer and artist Bruno Schulz is shot dead by a Gestapo officer, while walking through the "Aryan quarter" of his home town, Drohobych.

New books

Fiction
Samuel Hopkins Adams – The Harvey Girls
Martha Albrand – No Surrender
Nelson Algren – Never Come Morning
Thomas Armstrong – Dover Harbour
Nigel Balchin – Darkness Falls from the Air
Henry Bellamann – Floods of Spring
Earle Birney – David
 John Brophy – Immortal Sergeant
John Bude – Death Knows No Calendar
Taylor Caldwell – The Strong City
Albert Camus – The Stranger (L'Étranger)
John Dickson Carr
The Emperor's Snuff-Box
The Gilded Man (as by Carter Dickson)
Joyce Cary – To Be a Pilgrim
Camilo José Cela – The Family of Pascual Duarte (La Familia de Pascual Duarte)
Raymond Chandler – The High Window
Peter Cheyney 
 Dark Duet
 Never a Dull Moment
 Sorry You've Been Troubled
Agatha Christie
The Body in the Library
Five Little Pigs
The Moving Finger
James Gould Cozzens - The Just and the Unjust
John Creasey – The Toff Goes to Market
 Freeman Wills Crofts – Fear Comes to Chalfont
Lloyd C. Douglas – The Robe
Daphne du Maurier – Frenchman's Creek
Rachel Field – And Now Tomorrow
Anthony Gilbert – Something Nasty in the Woodshed
Natalia Ginzburg (as Alessandra Tornimparte) – La strada che va in città (The Road to the City)
Robert A. Heinlein – Beyond This Horizon
Robert Hichens – A New Way of Life
Robert Hillyer – My Heart for Hostage
Michael Innes – The Daffodil Affair
Kalki Krishnamurthy
Magudapathi
Parthiban Kanavu (பார்த்திபன் கனவு, Parthiban's Dream)
Maura Laverty – Never No More
C. S. Lewis – The Screwtape Letters (Christian apologetics)
E. C. R. Lorac
 Rope's End, Rogue's End
 The Sixteenth Stair
Mary McCarthy – The Company She Keeps
Sándor Márai – Embers (A gyertyák csonkig égnek, The Candles Burn Right Down)
Gladys Mitchell – Laurels are Poison
J. B. Priestley – Blackout in Gretley
Ellery Queen – Calamity Town
Raymond Queneau – Pierrot mon ami
Marjorie Kinnan Rawlings – Cross Creek
Clayton Rawson – No Coffin for the Corpse
Anna Seghers – The Seventh Cross (Das siebte Kreuz)
Nevil Shute – Pied Piper
 Georges Simenon – Young Cardinaud
Curt Siodmak – Donovan's Brain
Clark Ashton Smith – Out of Space and Time
Eleanor Smith
Caravan
The Man in Grey
John Steinbeck – The Moon is Down
Rex Stout – Black Orchids
Cecil Street 
 The Fourth Bomb
 Night Exercise
 This Undesirable Residence
Antal Szerb (as A. H. Redcliff) – Oliver VII (VII. Olivér)
Phoebe Atwood Taylor
The Six Iron Spiders
Three Plots for Asey Mayo
Tomita Tsuneo (富田常雄) – Sanshiro Sugata (姿三四郎)
Vercors – Le Silence de la mer
Hugh Walpole (died 1941) – The Killer and the Slain
Evelyn Waugh – Put Out More Flags
Franz Werfel – The Song of Bernadette
Cornell Woolrich – Black Alibi
S. Fowler Wright
Second Bout with the Mildew Gang
The Siege of Malta
Wu Cheng'en (吳承恩), translated by Arthur Waley – Monkey (15th century)
Xiao Hong (蕭紅) – Hulanhe zhuan (呼兰河传, Tales of the Hulan River)
Francis Brett Young – A Man About the House

Children and young people
BB (Denys Watkins-Pitchford) – The Little Grey Men
Enid Blyton
Five on a Treasure Island
Mary Mouse and the Doll's House
Eleanor Estes – The Middle Moffat
Janette Sebring Lowrey – The Poky Little Puppy
Diana Ross – The Little Red Engine Gets a Name (first in the Little Red Engine series of nine books)
David Severn – Rick Afire
Solomon Simon – Di Helden fun Khelm (The Heroes of Chełm)
Hildegarde Swift – The Little Red Lighthouse and the Great Gray Bridge
Elizabeth Gray Vining (as Elizabeth Janet Gray) – Adam of the Road
Ursula Moray Williams – Gobbolino, the Witch's Cat

Drama
Jean Anouilh – Antigone
Jacinto Benavente – 
Paul Vincent Carroll – The Strings Are False
Constance Cox – The Romance of David Garrick 
Henry de Montherlant – La Reine morte
Maurice Druon – Mégarée
Patrick Hastings – Escort
Arthur Miller – Thunder from the Hills (radio play)
Kaj Munk – Niels Ebbesen
Eugene O'Neill – A Touch of the Poet (written)
Terence Rattigan – Flare Path
John Van Druten – The Damask Cheek

Poetry
Morwenna Donnelly – Beauty and Ashes
T. S. Eliot – Little Gidding
Patrick Kavanagh – The Great Hunger
Saint-John Perse – Exil

Non-fiction
Elizabeth Bowen – Bowen's Court
Albert Camus – The Myth of Sisyphus (Le Mythe de Sisyphe)
Salvador Dalí – The Secret Life of Salvador Dalí
Edith Hamilton – Mythology
Richard Hillary – The Last Enemy
Aldous Huxley – The Art of Seeing
Beryl Markham – West with the Night
C. S. Lewis – A Preface to Paradise Lost
Elliot Paul – The Last Time I Saw Paris
Adam Clayton Powell, Sr. – Picketing Hell
Radu D. Rosetti – Odinioară
Antoine de Saint-Exupéry – Flight to Arras
Rebecca West – Black Lamb and Grey Falcon

Births
January 7 – Božin Pavlovski, Macedonian-Australian author
January 9 – Enrique Estrázulas, Uruguayan writer, poet, essayist, playwright, journalist and diplomat (died 2016)
January 19 – Paul-Eerik Rummo, Estonian poet, playwright and politician
January 31 – Derek Jarman, English film director, writer and diarist (died 1994)
February 1 – Terry Jones, Welsh comedic actor and writer (died 2020)
February – David Williamson, Australian playwright
March 2 – John Irving, American novelist and screenwriter
March 28 – Daniel Dennett, American philosopher, writer and cognitive scientist
April 1 – Samuel R. Delany, American novelist, essayist and critic
April 4 – Kitty Kelley, American biographer and journalist
April 20 – Arto Paasilinna, Finnish novelist and journalist
May 6 – Ariel Dorfman, Argentine/Chilean novelist, playwright and essayist
May 11 – Rachel Billington, English author
June 25 – Michel Tremblay, French Canadian novelist and playwright
August 2 – Isabel Allende, Chilean novelist
August 7 – Garrison Keillor, American humorous writer and broadcaster
September 1 – António Lobo Antunes, Portuguese novelist and physician
October 16 – Joseph Bruchac, Native American author
October 20 
 Bob Graham, Australian children's writer and illustrator
 Arto Paasilinna, Finnish writer (d. 2018)
October 23
Michael Crichton, American writer and director (died 2008)
Douglas Dunn, Scottish poet and scholar
October 24 – Frank Delaney, Irish-born novelist, journalist and broadcaster (died 2017)
November 7 – Helen Garner, Australian writer
November 8 – Fernando Sorrentino, Argentine writer
November 19 – Sharon Olds, American poet
November 24 – Craig Thomas, Welsh novelist (died 2011)
December 6 – Peter Handke, Austrian novelist and playwright
unknown date – Ghada al-Samman, Syrian writer

Deaths
January 14 – Porfirio Barba-Jacob, Colombian writer (born 1883)
February 2 – Daniil Kharms, Russian poet, writer and dramatist (died in prison, born 1905)
February 18 – Henri Stahl, Romanian historian, short story writer, memoirist and stenographer (born 1877)
March 16 – Rachel Field, American author and poet (born 1894)
March 26 – Carolyn Wells, American novelist and poet (born 1862)
March 28 – Miguel Hernández, Spanish poet (died in prison, born 1910)
April 24 – Lucy Maud Montgomery, Canadian novelist and children's writer (born 1874)
May 11 – Sakutarō Hagiwara (萩原 朔太郎), Japanese poet (born 1886)
May 20 – Nini Roll Anker, Norwegian novelist and playwright (born 1873)
May 26 – Libero Bovio, Neapolitan dialect poet (born 1883)
May 29 – Akiko Yosano (与謝野 晶子, Yosano Shiyo), Japanese poet and feminist (born 1878)
May – Jakob van Hoddis (Hans Davidsohn) German poet (died in extermination camp, born 1887)
June 30 – Léon Daudet, French writer and journalist (born 1867)
July 1 – Peadar Toner Mac Fhionnlaoich, Irish writer in Irish (born 1857)
August 17 – Irène Némirovsky, Russian-born French novelist (died in concentration camp, born 1903)
August 27 – Lev Nussimbaum, Russian and Azerbaijani novelist (gangrene; born 1905)
September 26 – Oskar Kraus, Czech philosopher (born 1872)
October 14 – Cosmo Hamilton, English dramatist and novelist (born 1870)
October 20 – Friedrich Münzer, German classicist (born 1868)
October 29 – Màrius Torres, Catalan Spanish poet (born 1910)
November 4
Eleanor Stackhouse Atkinson, American novelist and textbook and children's writer (born 1863)
Clementine Krämer, German poet and short-story writer (died in concentration camp, born 1873)
December 23 – Konstantin Balmont, Russian Symbolist poet and translator (born 1867)

Awards
Carnegie Medal for children's literature: Denys Watkins-Pitchford, The Little Grey Men
Frost Medal: Edgar Lee Masters
James Tait Black Memorial Prize for fiction: Arthur Waley, Translation of Monkey by Wu Cheng'en
James Tait Black Memorial Prize for biography: Lord Ponsonby of Shulbrede, Henry Ponsonby: Queen Victoria's Private Secretary
Newbery Medal for children's literature: Walter D. Edmonds, The Matchlock Gun
Nobel Prize for literature: not awarded
Pulitzer Prize for Drama: not awarded
Pulitzer Prize for Poetry: William Rose Benet, The Dust Which Is God
Pulitzer Prize for the Novel: Ellen Glasgow, In This Our Life

References

 
Years of the 20th century in literature